Coleophora festivella is a moth of the family Coleophoridae. It is found in Algeria and southern Spain.

The larvae feed on Lotus species. They create a lobe case.

References

festivella
Moths described in 1952
Moths of Africa
Moths of Europe